Greenwood County Airport  is a county-owned, public-use airport located three nautical miles (6 km) north of the central business district of Greenwood, a city in Greenwood County, South Carolina, United States. It is included in the National Plan of Integrated Airport Systems for 2011–2015, which categorized it as a general aviation facility. The airport does not have scheduled commercial airline service.

History 
Greenwood County Airport opened in November 1943 as a United States Army Air Force military airfield called Coronaca Army Airfield.  It was a sub-base of Greenville Army Air Base, supporting B-25 Mitchell medium bomber training for Third Air Force.  Training was accomplished by the 50th Station Complement Squadron.

The military use of the airport ended on December 31, 1945 and the airfield was turned over to civil authorities and converted into a civil airport in 1947.  It replaced the smaller Chinquapin Airport which was subsequently closed.

Facilities and aircraft 
Greenwood County Airport covers an area of 1,380 acres (558 ha) at an elevation of 631 feet (192 m) above mean sea level. It has one runway designated 9/27 with an asphalt surface measuring 5,003 by 100 feet (1,525 x 30 m).

For the 12-month period ending April 1, 2011, the airport had 40,000 aircraft operations, an average of 109 per day: 97% general aviation, 3% air taxi, and <1% military. At that time there were 53 aircraft based at this airport: 77% single-engine, 21% multi-engine, and 2% helicopter.

See also 

 South Carolina World War II Army Airfields
 List of airports in South Carolina

References 

 
 Manning, Thomas A. (2005), History of Air Education and Training Command, 1942–2002.  Office of History and Research, Headquarters, AETC, Randolph AFB, Texas

External links 
 Aerial image as of March 1999 from USGS The National Map
 

Airports in South Carolina
Buildings and structures in Greenwood County, South Carolina
Transportation in Greenwood County, South Carolina
Airfields of the United States Army Air Forces in South Carolina